Erik Anders Burius (born Erik Anders Jonsson; 2 August 1956 - 7 December 2004),  was a Swedish intellectual historian and director of the National Library of Sweden's manuscript department where he became known as the infamous "KB-mannen" (English: "the RL Man", after the Royal Library) after the theft and sale of several valuable books from the library's collection.

Biography 
Anders Burius studied at Uppsala University where he in 1984 did his intellectual history dissertation "Ömhet om friheten - Studier i frihetstidens censurpolitik" (English: "Care for freedom: studies in the literary censorship during Sweden's Age of Liberty"). He also passed degrees in law, librarian, and real estate broker. After his studies he worked, among other, at the Caroline Institute's library. Towards the end of the 1980s he applied for the position of professor in History of Books at Lund University, but did not receive it despite ardent appeals in the appointment process. Instead, for a short period, Anders Burius pursued a legal career before returning to the library world in 1995 as director of the National Library of Sweden's manuscript department.In a book released in 1995, "Biblioteken, kulturen och den sociala intelligensen" (editor: Lars Höglund), Anders Burius expressed in one article the view that all library history investigations need not be scientific in the strictest sense. Instead, Anders Burius emphasized the importance of practical experience and interaction with the current collections in his professional management. On behalf of the Swedish Academy, Anders Burius also wrote a commemorative book on the history of the Nobel Library.

After several years of stealing and selling at least 56 valuable books from the Nation Library's collection, Anders Burius was exposed and later confessed to the thefts in 2004. On 8 December 2004, at 04:39 in the morning SOS Alarm received calls about a major explosion in central Stockholm. Thirteen fire trucks from four fire departments were sent to the scene, sixteen police patrols blocked off the area, and fifty-five people were evacuated by bus. During a short release from pre-court custody Anders Burius had committed suicide by slitting his wrist and cutting the gas line in his apartment, which later resulted in an extensive explosion with about a dozen people injured. His body was found among the debris four days later.

Media 
In 2009, Sveriges Radio channel P1 aired a documentary about Anders Burius, Bibliotekarien by Jesper Huor, that won Stora Radiopriset (English: The Great Radio Award). During 2010 the drama series Bibliotekstjuven was made by SVT with Gustaf Skarsgård playing the lead, inspired by the events surrounding "the RL Man", and aired on SVT1 in January 2011. The director Daniel Lind Lagerlöf termed the series "a drama inspired by a real story" and "not a drama documentary".

Bibliography 

 Hundra år i litteraturprisets tjänst (2002)

References

External links 

 Anders Burius in Libris
 "Bibliotekarien – om brott och dubbelspel i Sveriges akademiska elit". (in Swedish), award winning documentary by P1 Dokumentär.
 Repo, Walter (1 August 2006). ”KB-mannens sista kapitel”. Café. (in Swedish). Archived from the original on 15 September 2016.
 Terese Cristiansson, Christian Holmén & Katarina Sternudd (13 December 2004). ”Dokument Expressen: Boktjuvens dubbelliv”. Expressen. (in Swedish) Archived from the original on 2 August 2013.
 ”"Bibliotekstjuven" stal även ur KIs boksamlingar”. (in Swedish) Karolinska institutet. Archived from the original on 23 February 2014.

Intellectual historians
1956 births
2004 deaths
2004 suicides
Suicides by sharp instrument in Sweden